Grevillea hakeoides is a species of flowering plant in the family Proteaceae and is endemic to the south-west of Western Australia. It is a spreading shrub with flat, linear or more or less-cylindrical leaves and dome-shaped groups of flowers, the colour varying according to subspecies.

Description

Taxonomy
Grevillea hakeoides was first formally described in 1848 by Carl Meissner in Johann Georg Christian Lehmann's Plantae Preissianae from specimens collected by James Drummond near the Swan River. The specific epithet (hakeoides) means "Hakea-like".

In 1986 Donald McGillivray described two subspecies in his book, New Names in Grevillea (Proteaceae), and the names are accepted by the Australian Plant Census:
Subspecies stenophylla was previously known as Grevillea stenophylla W.Fitzg.

Distribution and habitat
Subspecies stenophylla grows in heath, mallee heath or open shrubland, from Dirk Hartog Island to Watheroo and inland as far as Paynes Find in the Avon Wheatbelt, Carnarvon, Coolgardie, Geraldton Sandplains, Mallee, Murchison, Swan Coastal Plain and Yalgoo biogeographic regions.

Conservation status
Both subspecies of G. hakeoides are listed as "not threatened" by the Government of Western Australia Department of Biodiversity, Conservation and Attractions.

See also
 List of Grevillea species

References

hakeoides
Endemic flora of Western Australia
Eudicots of Western Australia
Proteales of Australia
Taxa named by Carl Meissner
Plants described in 1848